Mind the Gap is the second full studio album by Danish singer, songwriter, and actress Nabiha following her debut album Cracks and the reissued More Cracks with additional tracks.

Track listing

Release history

Charts

References

2013 albums
Nabiha albums
Border Breakers albums